Kidou Senshi Gundam Seed: Rengou vs. Z.A.F.T. is a third person arcade game based on the Gundam Seed franchise. It was developed in 2005 by Capcom and published by Bandai (now known as Bandai Namco Games) in Japan. Similarly to Mobile Suit Gundam: Gundam vs. Zeta Gundam, the player can choose to ally themselves with either O.M.N.I., Z.A.F.T. or Blue Cosmos and fight against the other factions. The Arcade Mode has 9 stages plus a bonus Extra Stage.

On November 11, 2005, a PlayStation 2 port was released in Japan which featured new pilots and units from the sequel Gundam Seed Destiny, as well as new unlockable features.

A sequel, Kidou Senshi Gundam Seed Destiny: Rengou vs. Z.A.F.T. II was released in 2006.

Kidou Senshi Gundam Seed: Rengou vs. Z.A.F.T. Portable

In March 2007, A port of the game was also released for the Sony PSP by Bandai Namco Games in Japan. In addition to the extras available in the PlayStation 2 version of the game, the PSP version includes an all new Mission Mode with missions based on the plot of the anime. Aside from the new mode, the PSP version is an otherwise direct port of the PlayStation 2 version with all unlockables from PS2 version already unlocked in the PSP game without the need to play Arcade Mode several times.

Game Modes

Arcade Mode
This mode provides the same basic gameplay as the original arcade, with the added bonus that players may configure various fight settings to customize the gameplay. The AI skill level, along with Damage dealt/received, round time, boost gauge, and other options for Arcade battles, may be adjusted in Game Options. Players may also choose to engage in cooperative gameplay with a friend in the Arcade multiplayer co-op mode. However, not all units in the game are playable in this mode.

Free Battle/VS Mode
Versus Mode features all playable units in the game, including units you cannot select in Arcade Mode. This mode supports up to 4 human players or play against 3 AI opponents in a free-for-all deathmatch or in teams. The PlayStation Portable version uses the PSP's Ad Hoc mode to connect players but does not support Game sharing so each player must have their own copy of the game.

Mission Mode (PSP Exclusive only)
In Mission Mode, players must first choose O.M.N.I. or Z.A.F.T. as his/her alliance. About half-way through the storyline, players can choose to either continue serving their original alliance or defect to the Orb Union. Players start off with two of four basic units, depending on their initial alliance. Players fighting for the O.M.N.I. forces start off with the FX-550 Skygrasper and UWMF/S-1 GINN WASP. Those playing as Z.A.F.T. pilots are given the TFA-2 ZuOOT and UWMF/S-1 GINN. As the game progresses, players will also acquire new units after beating certain missions. Additionally, points awarded after each mission allow players to upgrade to better mobile suits by filling up their SP gauge (similar to leveling up with an EXP gauge in most RPGs). Different units are made available depending on the choice of upgrades selected by the player.

Playable Units
ZAFT :
 ZGMF-X56S/α Force Impulse Gundam *PS2/PSP version only*
 ZGMF-X56S/β Sword Impulse Gundam *PS2/PSP version only*
 ZGMF-X56S/γ Blast Impulse Gundam *PS2/PSP version only*
 ZGMF-X23S Saviour Gundam *PS2/PSP version only*
 ZGMF-1001/K Slash ZAKU *PS2/PSP version only*
 ZGMF-1001/M Blaze ZAKU Phantom *PS2/PSP version only*
 ZGMF-1000/A1 Gunner ZAKU Warrior (Lunamaria Hawke custom) *PS2/PSP version only*
 ZGMF-1000 ZAKU Warrior *PS2/PSP version only*
 ZGMF-1000/A1 Gunner ZAKU Warrior *PS2/PSP version only*
 ZGMF-LRR704B GINN Long Range Reconnaissance Type
 ZGMF-X13A Providence Gundam
 ZGMF-600 GuAIZ
 ZGMF-600 GuAIZ (Commander)
 ZGMF-515 CGUE
 TMF/A-802 BuCUE (Rail cannons)
 TMF/A-802 BuCUE (Missile pods)
 TMF/A-803 LaGOWE
 TMF/S-3 GINN OCHER Type
 TF/A-2 ZuOOT
 AMF-101 DINN
 AMF-101 DINN (Commander)
 UMF-4A GOOhN
 UMF-5 ZnO
 GAT-X102 Duel Gundam
 GAT-X102 Duel Gundam Assault Shroud
 GAT-X103 Buster Gundam
 GAT-X207 Blitz Gundam
 GAT-X303 Aegis Gundam
 YMF-01B Proto GINN (AKA ZGMT-01 GINN Trainer)

OMNI:
 ZGMF-X24S Chaos Gundam *PS2/PSP version only*
 ZGMF-X31S Abyss Gundam *PS2/PSP version only*
 ZGMF-X88S Gaia Gundam *PS2/PSP version only*
 GAT-01 Strike Dagger
 GAT-X131 Calamity Gundam
 GAT-X252 Forbidden Gundam
 GAT-X370 Raider Gundam
 FX-550+AQM/E-X01 Aile Grasper (VS Mode only)
 FX-550+AQM/E-X02 Sword Grasper (VS Mode only)
 FX-550+AQM/E-X03 Launcher Grasper (VS Mode only)
 TS-MA2mod.00 Moebius Zero (VS Mode only)

Orb Union:
 ZGMF-X10A Freedom Gundam
 ZGMF-X10A Freedom Gundam Equipped with "M.E.T.E.O.R." (VS Mode Only)
 ZGMF-X09A Justice Gundam
 ZGMF-X09A Justice Gundam Equipped with "M.E.T.E.O.R." (VS Mode Only)
 MBF-M1 M1 Astray
 MBF-02+AQM/E-X01 Aile Strike Rouge
 GAT-X105 Strike Gundam (beam rifle)
 GAT-X105 Strike Gundam (bazooka)
 GAT-X105+AQM/E-X01 Aile Strike Gundam
 GAT-X105+AQM/E-X02 Sword Strike Gundam
 GAT-X105+AQM/E-X03 Launcher Strike Gundam

Playable Characters
ZAFT :
 Shinn Asuka *PS2/PSP version only* 
 Lunamaria Hawke *PS2/PSP version only*
 Rey Za Burrel *PS2/PSP version only*
 Athrun Zala (SEED)
 Athrun Zala (DESTINY) *PS2/PSP version only* 
 Yzak Joule (SEED)
 Yzak Joule (Scar)
 Yzak Joule (DESTINY) *PS2/PSP version only* 
 Dearka Elsman
 Dearka Elsman (DESTINY) *PS2/PSP version only* 
 Rau Le Creuset
 Nicol Amalfi
 Miguel Aiman
 Andrew Waltfeld
 Andrew Waltfeld and Aisha
 Marco Morassim
 ZAFT Green Pilot
 ZAFT Red Pilot
 Heine Westenfluss

OMNI:
 Sting Oakley *PS2/PSP version only*
 Stella Loussier *PS2/PSP version only* 
 Auel Neider *PS2/PSP version only* 
 Orga Sabnak
 Clotho Buer
 Shani Andras
 OMNI Pilot

Orb Union:
 Kira Yamato (SEED Student)
 Kira Yamato (SEED Pilot Suit)
 Kira Yamato (ZAFT Pilot Suit)
 Kira Yamato (DESTINY) *PS2/PSP version only* 
 Cagalli Yula Athha (Desert Suit)
 Cagalli Yula Athha (Pilot Suit)
 Mu La Flaga
 Sai Argyle
 Tolle Koenig
 Asagi Caldwell
 Mayura Labatt
 Juri Wu Nien
 Orb Union Pilot

2005 video games
Capcom games
Bandai games
Bandai Namco games
Gundam video games
Arcade video games
Japan-exclusive video games
PlayStation Portable games
PlayStation 2 games
Third-person shooters
Video games developed in Japan